Nadia Petrova and Meghann Shaughnessy defeated Cara Black and Rennae Stubbs in the final, 7–5, 6–2 to win the doubles tennis title at the 2004 WTA Tour Championships.

Virginia Ruano Pascual and Paola Suárez were the defending champions, but were defeated in the semifinals by Black and Stubbs.

Seeds 
 Virginia Ruano Pascual /  Paola Suárez (semifinals)
 Svetlana Kuznetsova /  Elena Likhovtseva (semifinals)

Draw

Finals

References 

Doubles
2004 WTA Tour